Nelson Pearce Elliott (6 August 1925 – 1 April 2017) was a Progressive Conservative party member of the House of Commons of Canada. He was a farmer by career.

He represented the London—Middlesex electoral district which he won in the 1979 federal election. After serving one term, the 31st Canadian Parliament, Elliott left national politics in 1980 and did not campaign in that year's election.

External links

References

1925 births
2017 deaths
Members of the House of Commons of Canada from Ontario
Progressive Conservative Party of Canada MPs